The Faulkner-Blanchard was a brass era automobile manufactured in Detroit, Michigan by the Faulkner-Blanchard Motor Car Company in 1910.

A prototype was made in mid-1910. The vehicle cost $2,500.

References

 

Defunct motor vehicle manufacturers of the United States
Motor vehicle manufacturers based in Michigan
Defunct manufacturing companies based in Detroit